Ctenothrissa is a prehistoric genus of ray-finned fish in the supposed order "Ctenothrissiformes".

Taxonomy
These Teleostei are only known from fossils. While they are sometimes included in the superorder Acanthopterygii or Protacanthopterygii, this is neither well-supported, nor is the monophyly of the "Ctenothrissiformes" robustly established. Indeed, it is quite likely that the supposed order is a paraphyletic assemblage of ancient moderately advanced Teleostei.

Gallery

See also 

 Prehistoric fish
 List of prehistoric bony fish

Bibliography 
  (2009): Catalogue of Organisms – Living Larvae and Fossil Fish. Version of 2009-FEB-05. Retrieved 2009-SEP-28.
 Carroll, R. L. 1988. Vertebrate Paleontology and Evolution. New York: W. H. Freeman & Co.
 M. Gayet, A. Belouze & P. Abi Saad, 2003. Liban Mémoire du Temps. Les Poissons fossiles. Éditions Desiris.
 Patterson, C. 1964. "A review of Mesozoic acanthpterygian fishes, with special reference to those of the English chalk." Phil. Trans. Roy Soc. London 247(B):213-482.
 Woodward, A. S., 1899: Additional notes on some Type specimens of Cretaceous Fishes from Mount Lebanon in the Edinburgh Museum of Science and Art. Annals of Natural History, IV 317-321
Woodward, A. S., 1899: Note on some Cretaceous clupeoid fishes with pectinated scales (Ctenothrissa and Pseudoberyx). Annals and Magazine of Natural History, series 7 3:489-492 [M. Carrano/M. Carrano]
 Woodward, A.S., 1891–1901. Catalogue of Fossil Fishes in the British Museum, Parts 1–4. London: British Museum.

References 

Prehistoric ray-finned fish genera
Cretaceous bony fish
Late Cretaceous fish of Asia